State Route 511 (SR 511) is a  north–south state highway in the northern portion of the U.S. state of Ohio.

Route description
Along its way, SR 511 passes through Ashland and Lorain counties.  There are no segments of SR 511 that are included as a part of the National Highway System (NHS).  The NHS is a network of highways identified as being most important for the economy, mobility and defense of the nation.

History
The SR 511 designation was applied in 1937.  Originally, the highway was routed from its present southern terminus at SR 39 to its western junction with US 20 just south of Kipton.

The highway was extended north through Kipton and then east through Oberlin to its current northern terminus at the US 20 freeway just east of Oberlin in 1989.  This extension replaced what was formerly the westernmost portion of SR 10, and coincided the completion of the US 20 freeway heading northeast from the Oberlin area toward Elyria.  The western terminus of SR 10 was relocated to the junction of US 20 and SR 57 just southeast of Elyria at that time, and SR 511 was extended as a result.

Major intersections

References

511
Transportation in Ashland County, Ohio
Transportation in Lorain County, Ohio